The prime minister of the Nakhchivan Autonomous Republic is the head of government of Nakhchivan Autonomous Republic, an exclave of Azerbaijan Republic. In accordance with Article 37 of the Constitution of the Nakhchivan Autonomous Republic:

The prime minister is a member of and chairs the Cabinet of Ministers of the Nakhchivan Autonomous Republic, which exercises executive power in the autonomy and represents the Nakhchivan Autonomous Republic in the Cabinet of Ministers of the Azerbaijan Republic in economic and cultural fields.

Prime ministers of the Nakhchivan Autonomous Republic

See also 

 Prime Minister of Azerbaijan

References

External links
 Nakhchivan Autonomous Republic  
 Executive and administrative bodies of state power of the Nakhchivan ASSR - Nakhchivan Autonomous Republic
 Worldstatesmen: Nakhchivan (Naxçıvan)

Government of Azerbaijan